George DeLeone (May 9, 1948 – March 1, 2022) was an American football offensive line coach for Baylor University.

Prior to rejoining Temple's staff, where he was once the offensive coordinator from 2006 through 2007, DeLeone was an offensive line coach for the Cleveland Browns. DeLeone was once the head coach at Southern Connecticut State University (SCSU) from 1976 to 1979, where he compiled a record of 15 wins and 24 losses. DeLeone served in assistant coach & coordinator positions at Southern Connecticut, Rutgers, Holy Cross, Syracuse, Ole Miss, Temple, UConn, and Baylor.

He spent four years in the National Football League (NFL) with the San Diego Chargers and Miami Dolphins. He attended UConn and SCSU.

In 2021, DeLeone's son, Mark, became the linebackers coach of the Detroit Lions. Mark DeLeone has been a defensive assistant coach in college football and the NFL since 2007.

DeLeone died on March 1, 2022, at the age of 73.

References

1948 births
2022 deaths
Baylor Bears football coaches
Cleveland Browns coaches
Holy Cross Crusaders football coaches
Miami Dolphins coaches
Ole Miss Rebels football coaches
Rutgers Scarlet Knights football coaches
San Diego Chargers coaches
Southern Connecticut State Owls football coaches
Syracuse Orange football coaches
Temple Owls football coaches
UConn Huskies football coaches
Southern Connecticut State University alumni
University of Connecticut alumni
Coaches of American football from Connecticut
Sportspeople from New Haven, Connecticut